Acrolepia aureonigrella is a moth of the family Acrolepiidae. It was first described by Lord Walsingham in 1907. It is endemic to the Hawaiian island of Molokai.

The larvae probably feed on Nothocestrum species. They probably mine the leaves of their host plant.

External links

Acrolepiidae
Endemic moths of Hawaii
Biota of Molokai
Moths described in 1907